C. Shannon Bacon (born 1971/1972) is an American attorney, legal scholar, and jurist serving as the chief justice of the New Mexico Supreme Court.

Early life and education

Bacon was raised in North Valley, New Mexico. She earned a Bachelor of Arts from Creighton University in Omaha and a Juris Doctor from the Creighton University School of Law.

Career 
After graduating from law school, Bacon returned to Albuquerque, where she was admitted to the State Bar of New Mexico in 1997. She was formerly partner at a pair of Albuquerque law firms and clerked under Judge A. Joseph Alarid at the New Mexico Court of Appeals. Bacon is an adjunct professor at the University of New Mexico School of Law, where she teaches courses on evidence and trial practice.

Judicial service

State district court 
Bacon was appointed a Judge of the Second Judicial District Court in 2010, where she served until her elevation to the Supreme Court.

New Mexico Supreme Court 
In December 2018, Bacon was one of fourteen applicants who applied for two upcoming vacancies on the Supreme Court. On January 11, 2019 the Nominating Commission submitted her name along with six others to fill the vacancies. On January 25, 2019 Governor Michelle Lujan Grisham announced her pick of Bacon to fill the vacancy left by the retirement of Charles W. Daniels. She was sworn in on February 4, 2019. She was elected to serve as the next chief justice of the New Mexico Supreme Court and sworn in on April 13, 2022.

Personal
Bacon identifies as a lesbian. She is the first openly LGBT member of the New Mexico Supreme Court.

See also 
 List of LGBT jurists in the United States
 List of LGBT state supreme court justices in the United States

References

External links

|-

1970s births
20th-century American women lawyers
20th-century American lawyers
21st-century American judges
21st-century American women judges
Creighton University School of Law alumni
Justices of the New Mexico Supreme Court
Living people
New Mexico lawyers
New Mexico state court judges
University of New Mexico staff
Year of birth missing (living people)
LGBT judges
LGBT people from New Mexico
Chief Justices of the New Mexico Supreme Court